Fifth generation or Fifth Generation may refer to:

Religion
 5th Generation (religious association), a Brazilian Christian association, founded in 2014 by Gabriel Gomes

Technology 
 5th-Generation Wireless Systems, mobile telecommunications technologies
 Fifth generation computer, a Japanese computing initiative begun in 1982
 Fifth-generation programming language, a constraint-based programming language
 History of video game consoles (fifth generation) (1993-2002)
 Fifth generation or Video iPod, a version of the iPod Classic
 Fifth Generation Systems, a security and utility software manufacturer for PCs and Macs founded in 1984

Transportation 
 Fifth generation jet fighter (2005–present)
 Fifth-generation Chevrolet Camaro (2009–present)
 Fifth-generation Ford Mustang (2005–present)
 Ford Taurus (fifth generation) (2007-2009)
 Honda Civic (fifth generation) (1992-1995)

Other uses
 Fifth generation of Chinese leadership, the expected Communist Chinese leadership from the 2012 18th Party Congress
 Fifth Generation, a 1980s-1990s collective of filmmakers in the cinema of China

See also 
Generation (disambiguation)
5G (disambiguation)